The Dalit Shoshit Samaj Sangharsh Samiti, abbreviated as DS-4 or DSSSS (lit. "Dalit and other Exploited Groups Struggle Committee") was founded on 6 December 1981 by Kanshi Ram to organise dalits and other oppressed groups of India. It was related to BAMCEF.

DS4's slogan was "Brahmin, Thakur, Bania chhor, baaki sab hain DS-4". ("Leaving Brahmins, Thakurs and Banias, everyone else is DS-4.")

The organisation was absorbed by the Bahujan Samaj Party in 1984.

References 

Youth wings of political parties in India
Dalit politics
Ambedkarite organisations